Jennifer Yvonne McFalls (born November 10, 1971) is an American, former collegiate All-American, gold-medal winning Olympian softball player and current head coach originally from Grand Prairie, Texas. She is head of the Kansas Jayhawks softball. team She played college softball at Texas A&M as a utility player and shortstop. She then went on to represent Team USA, being named an Olympic alternate in 1996 and a member of the 2000 team that won gold. After her years playing softball McFalls decided to become a coach with her first position as the assistant coach at Texas A&M. Mcfalls continued to coach for many years with several different schools at many different competitive levels. She was the head coach of the National Pro Fastpitch professional softball team, the Dallas Charge for their inaugural season.

Early life 
Born in Arlington, Texas and raised in Grand Prairie, Mcfalls began to play softball at age the early age of 8. She was first introduced to softball though her family, many family members had encouraged her to play. As Mcfalls got older she moved on to more competitive leagues within the Dallas and Fort Worth area. She started to play for a team called the Everman Shadows. In high school, she was a multisport athlete. She played Volleyball, Soccer, and Basketball. Softball was not offered at her school so she could not play during her high school career. Although she did play in the summer on a select softball team this is where she was first recruited by Bob Brock at A&M University at the age of 16.  McFalls graduated from South Grand Prairie High School in 1990.

Collegiate career 
At Texas A&M University, she started at shortstop for Texas A&M Aggies softball from 1991 to 1994. She graduated from Texas A&M with a degree in kinesiology in 1997. While there she was a major component to the Women's Softball team. McFalls was an All-American Shortstop and led her team in highest batting average all four season during her career at Texas A&M. She also led her team in hits, total bases, and slugging percentage. McFalls was named Texas A&M's Female Athlete of the Year in 1994. She was also elected to the Texas A&M hall of Fame in 2001. While at Texas A&M she received the awards for All American 1993, and All- South Region 1st Team during the years of 1993 and 1994.

USA Softball 
Mcfalls started out her Olympic career as the 1996 alternative soon after she became the world champion gold medal winner in 1998. In the following year she was the Pan American Games winner. From 1994 to 2000 she was a part of the U.S. National team. She played in several of the 2000 Olympic games. McFalls helped score the game winning run in the bottom of the eight in the victory over Japan winning 2–1. McFalls walked twice and scored two runs in the games overall.

Coaching career 
McFalls first began coaching career as an assistant coach for three seasons at Texas A&M from 1995 to 1997 and one season at the University of Oklahoma 1997–1998. After her seasons at the collegiate level McFalls went on to become the fastpitch softball academy director at Power Alley in Grand Prairie, Texas from 2002 to 2003. Shortly after McFalls took an assistant athletic director and head softball coach position at Hockday School in Dallas, Texas. She spent 2 years at the school from 2003 to 2005. She was then offered a position at Midlothian High School, in Midlothian Texas where she became the head coach and assistant athletic director. With a winning record of 139–48 and leading her team to five consecutive playoff appearances. During her time at Midlothian High School she was also a part of the USA Softball selection committee from 2005 to 2010 and served as the assistant coach for Team USA at the 2010 Canadian Open Fast Pitch International Championship.

McFalls then started to coach for Texas in 2010, as an assistant coach under head coach Connie Clark. In 2015, she was hired as the head coach for the National Pro Fastpitch team, the Dallas Charge. Clark resigned following the 2018 season, and McFalls did not return to the coaching staff.

On August 22, 2018, McFalls was named head coach at Kansas.

Statistics

Texas A&M Aggies

Head coaching record

College

References

External links 
 
 

1971 births
Living people
Female sports coaches
American softball coaches
Softball coaches from Texas
Kansas Jayhawks softball coaches
Texas A&M Aggies softball players
Texas Longhorns softball coaches
Oklahoma Sooners softball coaches
Olympic softball players of the United States
Olympic gold medalists for the United States in softball
Softball players at the 2000 Summer Olympics
Medalists at the 2000 Summer Olympics
People from Grand Prairie, Texas
Sportspeople from Arlington, Texas
Softball players from Texas
Texas A&M Aggies softball coaches